Simonsen & Weel A/S is Denmark's oldest supplier of equipment to the Danish health sector, with a history dating back to 1817. The company sells products from several international manufacturers of medical equipment, OR tables, compression stockings, medical nutrition etc. The company has also developed their own pressure relieving bed mattresses, table mattresses and positioning pads under the brand name ESWELL.

History 
1817 Simonsen & Weel is founded by wholesaler I.I. Weel
1864 Hiring of Julius Lippmann, whose family since the end of the 1880s owns the company during four generations
1906 Simonsen & Weel becomes purveyor to HM the Queen of Denmark
1939 Ole Lippmann introduces the first anesthesia apparatus
1988 Simonsen & Weel Medico Teknik is sold to Vickers plc, and Simonsen & Weel continues as a distribution agency in Denmark
1997 Simonsen & Weel is sold to Bure Equity, and in the same year becomes part of the Swedish Simonsen Group
2003 Simonsen & Weel is back to Danish ownership with majority shareholder Rolf Bladt as Managing Director and Torben Bjerring as co-owner and Vice President
2007 Simonsen & Weel develops and introduces its own program of mattresses and positioning pads for the Operating Theatre under the brand ESWELL
2008 Simonsen & Weel receives the first export orders of ESWELL
2010 Simonsen & Weel buys stake in UNICDOC (with international sales rights of the UNICDOC picture and video documentation system)

External links 
 Official website

References 
 
 

Health care companies of Denmark
Companies based in Vallensbæk Municipality
Danish companies established in 1817
Danish brands